Frontline is the fourth studio album by the Australian folk-rock group Redgum.  It was the last album that John Schumann performed on before he left the group at the end of 1985.

Track listing

Personnel
The Band
 Michael Atkinson – vocals, guitar
 Hugh McDonald – acoustic and electric guitars, violin, vocals
 John Schumann – vocals, acoustic guitar
 Verity Truman – saxophone, flute, vocals
 Stephen Cooney - bass, didgeridoo, guitar, mandolin, banjo, vocals
 Brian Czempinski - drums
 Michael Spicer - piano, keyboards

Guests
 Mick O'Connor - Hammond organ
 Michael Harris - violin
 Dobe Newton - lagerphone
 Wilbur Wilde - saxophone
 Bill Harrower - saxophone, alto flute
 Trevor Lucas - guitar
 Greg Sheehan - percussion
 Tim Fetters - trumpet

Technical
 Trevor Lucas - producer
 Tony Buettel - engineer
 Richmond Recorders - recording studio
 Music Farm Studios - mixing studio

Design
 A&L Barnum Graphic Design, CBS Art Studio - artwork
 Ron Bell, The Age - front cover photography
 The Age, Peter Dombrovskis, Greg Noakes - back cover photography
 Stuart Fox - insert photography

Charts

References

1984 albums
Redgum albums